Hongqiao Subdistrict is a subdistrict of Xuanwei City, Yunnan, People's Republic of China, located in the southern suburbs of the city  from downtown. , it has 3 residential communities (社区) and 1 village under its administration.

References 

Township-level divisions of Qujing